Julius Adams (April 26, 1948 – March 24, 2016) was an American professional football player who spent his entire career as a defensive lineman for the New England Patriots in the National Football League (NFL).  He played college football for the Texas Southern Tigers. Adams was selected by the Patriots in the second round of the 1971 NFL Draft. He was selected to the Pro Bowl in 1980.

College career
Adams was a four-year starter at Texas Southern where he was twice tabbed All-conference in 1968 and 1970. He played in the College Football All-Star game in Chicago prior to his rookie season in the NFL.

Professional career
Adams was drafted in the 2nd round of the 1971 NFL Draft. He started as a rookie and was chosen to the UPI All-Rookie team in 1971. He was Patriots' leading sacker with 7.5 in 1974 and was named as one of the NFL's top defensive linemen by Pro QB Magazine. The following year, he missed five games due to a foot injury. Adams was the team's top tackler at 47 among the defensive linemen in 1976, and also had six sacks and 12 quarterback pressures. He started 14 games in 1977 and had 9.5 sacks. That season, he ended with 43 tackles.

After missing all but the season opener of the 1978 season with a shoulder injury, he returned in 1979 to play all 16 games. His six quarterback sacks played a vital part in the Patriots' NFL leading total of 57 quarterback sacks. He also had 49 tackles, 13 quarterback pressures and a fumble recovery. In 1980, he made his first and only Pro Bowl appearance and earned that honor with 59 tackles and led the team with nine sacks and finished second on the team in 1980 with 13 quarterback pressures. In 1981, he was eighth on the team in tackles with 54 stops and 30 assists and his outstanding play and leadership enabled him to win the Jim Lee Hunt Memorial Award, given to the most outstanding Patriot lineman. In 1982, he finished second among Patriots' defensive linemen on the tackle chart with 45 and he also made one of the biggest plays of his career that season when he blocked a Uwe von Schamann field goal attempt in the Patriots 3-0 win over Miami (12-12-82).

Adams was again the top tackler among Patriots' defensive linemen in 1983 with a total of 83 tackles and he also finished second on the team in quarterback sacks with eight and third with seven quarterback pressures. In 1984, he made 34 tackles and four sacks, seven quarterback pressures and one pass deflection in playing. He also blocked an extra-point kick late in the first half vs. Miami in October 1984. He started one game in 1984, the final game vs. Indianapolis (12-16-84) and in that game, came up with a blocked field goal on a 42-yarder with five minutes left in a game the Patriots led at the time, 13-10 (went on to win, 16-10). He was given a game ball for his effort.

Adams' play and leadership was indispensable in 1985. He played in all twenty games for the Patriots' first Super Bowl team, compiling five sacks in the regular season. Having announced his retirement, he was introduced individually before the final home game in Foxborough, in which the Patriots defeated Cincinnati, clinching a postseason berth. Adams recovered a fumble in the AFC Championship Game in Miami on January 12, 1986, where New England won their unprecedented third straight road playoff game, defeating the Dolphins. It was the Patriots' first victory in the Orange Bowl after 18 consecutive losses in 19 years. He returned to the Patriots in 1987, playing in ten games.

Personal life
After retiring from professional football Adams lived in Atlanta, Georgia with his wife Patricia Adams until his death on March 24, 2016. His son, Keith Adams, played in the NFL from 2001 to 2007.

References

1948 births
2016 deaths
American Conference Pro Bowl players
American football defensive tackles
American football defensive ends
New England Patriots players
Texas Southern Tigers football players
Players of American football from Georgia (U.S. state)
Sportspeople from Macon, Georgia